Boluspor is a Turkish professional football club located in the city of Bolu. The clubs plays in red and white kits, and have done so since their formation in 1965. Some of famous players of her were Lütfü Isıgöllü, Sinan Alayoğlu, Sadullah Acele, Rıdvan Dilmen, Sercan Görgülü, Halil İbrahim Eren, Recep Çetin, Ali Beykoz, Şenol Fidan, Müfit İkizoğlu and Faruk Yiğit.

Domestically, the club has won the TFF Second League on one occasion, finishing as runner-up to the Turkish Cup. Their greatest success in top-flight football came in 1974, when they finished in third place.

History
Boluspor became a professional club when they entered the TFF Second League (now TFF First League) during the 1966–67 season. They were first promoted into the TFF First League (Now Super League) after the 1969–70 season. They finished third, their highest finish in the Süper Lig in 1973-74 season.

The club has competed in continental competition once, losing to Dinamo Bucharest, in the 1974–75 UEFA Cup. They also competed in the now defunct Balkans Cup, winning matches against clubs such as Sofya Akademik and Sport Clup Bacau, but never won the cup.

League participations

Süper League: 1970-79, 1980–85, 1986–92

First League: 1966-70, 1979–80, 1985–86, 1992–96, 1997-2001, 2007-

Second League: 1996-97, 2001-2002, 2005-2007

Third League: 2002-2005

Honours
Turkish Cup:
Runners-up (1): 1981
TFF Second League:
Winners (1): 2007
Prime Minister's Cup:
Winners (1): 1970
Prime Minister's Cup:
Winners (1): 1981
Süper Lig:
Runners-up (3): 1974
Süper Lig:
Runners-up (4): 1983

European competitions

UEFA Cup:

Players

Current squad

Other players under contract

Out on loan

References

External links
Official website
Boluspor on TFF.org

 
Sport in Bolu
Football clubs in Turkey
Association football clubs established in 1965
1965 establishments in Turkey
Süper Lig clubs